is a Japanese anime television series directed by Shigeru Kimiya and animated by TNK. It aired in Japan from October 4, 2004, to December 27, 2004, for a total of 13 episodes.

Characters

Media

Manga

Episode 1 Voyeur Molester. Musumet Underwear. 

Episode 2 Tentacle Escape! Slimy musumet

Episode 3 electric current! Musumet faints

Episode 4 Tickling torture? Musumet in the Electric Chair!

Anime

References

External links

2004 anime television series debuts
Action anime and manga
TNK (company)
Anime series based on manga
Magical girl anime and manga
Superheroes in anime and manga